Armenia and the North Atlantic Treaty Organization have maintained a formal relationship since 1992, when Armenia joined the North Atlantic Cooperation Council. Armenia officially established bilateral relations with NATO in 1994 when it became a member of NATO's Partnership for Peace (PfP) programme. In 2002, Armenia became an Associate Member of the NATO Parliamentary Assembly.

Cooperation 

Armenia regained its independence from the Soviet Union in 1991. Since then, Armenia has pursued developing closer Euro-Atlantic ties with the member states of NATO. Armenia joined the North Atlantic Cooperation Council in 1992, which was succeeded in 1997 by the Euro-Atlantic Partnership Council (EAPC). The EAPC brings together NATO allies and partner countries from the Euro-Atlantic area.  On 5 October 1994, Armenia became a member of the Partnership for Peace programme.

The Armenian Atlantic Association, established in 2001, seeks to promote Armenia–NATO relations. It is a full member of the Atlantic Treaty Association. In 2002, Armenia became an Associate Member of the NATO Parliamentary Assembly. In 2004, Armenia established a Permanent Mission to NATO located in Brussels, Belgium. In 2007, a NATO Information Centre opened in Yerevan.

Armenia organizes an annual "NATO Week", which raises awareness of the country's engagements with NATO.

Individual Partnership Action Plan 
On 16 December 2005, Armenia signed an Individual Partnership Action Plan (IPAP) with NATO. IPAP's are plans developed between NATO and different countries which outline the objectives and the communication framework for dialogue and cooperation between both parties. As part of Armenia's Individual Partnership Action Plan, Armenia and NATO cooperate in the defense sphere, improving democratic standards and the rule of law, and tackling corruption.

Euro-Atlantic Disaster Response Coordination Centre 
Armenia cooperates with the Euro-Atlantic Disaster Response Coordination Centre (EADRCC). NATO and Armenia jointly established the Crisis Management National Centre in Yerevan. Between 11–16 September 2010, in cooperation with the EADRCC, Armenia hosted its "Armenia 2010" civil emergency exercise near Yerevan, which was one of NATO’s largest ever events for disaster response. Armenian rescue teams actively participate in the activities of the EADRCC and take part in various civil emergency exercises.

Science for Peace and Security 
Since 1993, Armenia has been involved in the NATO Science for Peace and Security (SPS) programme. Areas of cooperation include defense against chemical, biological, and nuclear agents, counter-terrorism, and cyberwarfare.

Peacekeeping operations 
Armenia has participated in certain NATO peacekeeping operations, including:

Afghanistan 
In February 2010, Armenia deployed approximately 130 soldiers in Afghanistan, as part of the NATO-led International Security Assistance Force (ISAF). They served under German command protecting an airport in Kunduz.

Iraq 
After the end of the invasion of Iraq, Armenia deployed a unit of 46 peacekeepers under Polish command. Armenian peacekeepers were based in Al-Kut,  from the capital of Baghdad.

Kosovo 
Since 2004, Armenia has been an active contributor to the NATO-led operation in Kosovo and currently deploys approximately 70 peacekeepers as part of NATO's Kosovo Force.

Potential membership 
Armenia is unlikely to join NATO in the near term, as its policies often align it closer with Russia. It is a founding member of the Collective Security Treaty Organization (CSTO), an alternative Russian-led military alliance. NATO support for the territorial integrity of Azerbaijan (an ally of NATO member Turkey) in its dispute with Armenia over Nagorno-Karabakh has led to tensions with the alliance.

However, several politicians and political parties have called on the Government of Armenia to withdraw Armenia's membership in the Collective Security Treaty Organization and either seek full membership in NATO or become a major non-NATO ally. For example, the European Party of Armenia has campaigned in favor of Armenia's membership in NATO, while the Armenian National Movement Party calls for developing deeper relations with NATO.

After the start of renewed fighting between Armenia and Azerbaijan on 13 September 2022, Armenia triggered the mutual defence Article 4 of the CSTO treaty.  However, the CSTO mission sent to monitor the situation along the border took a rather uncommitted position in the conflict, leading to increased criticism towards CTSO membership inside Armenian political circles, with the secretary of the Security Council of Armenia, Armen Grigoryan even stating that he saw no more hope for the CSTO. The lack of Russian support during the conflict prompted a national debate in Armenia, as an increasing percentage of the population put into doubt whether it is beneficial to continue CSTO membership, calling for realignment of the state with NATO instead. This coincided with a visit from Speaker of the United States House of Representatives Nancy Pelosi to Yerevan on 17 September 2022, largely seen as an effort to reorient the security alliance structure of Armenia. On 23 November 2022, opposition protestors gathered in Yerevan, led by the anti-Russian National Democratic Pole Alliance. Protestors called for the withdrawal of Armenia from the CSTO and for the country to develop closer relations with the United States and the West.

Bilateral visits 
In 1999, Armenian President Robert Kocharyan participated in the 50th anniversary Summit of NATO in Washington, D.C. In 2001, the Secretary General of NATO, George Robertson visited Armenia. In 2005, Robert Kocharyan held meetings at NATO headquarters in Belgium. In 2008, President Serzh Sargsyan attended a NATO meeting in Romania and also met with Secretary General Jaap De Hoop Scheffer in Belgium later that year. In 2009, Claudio Bizoniero, deputy Secretary General visited Armenia. In 2010, Serzh Sargsyan held a meeting at NATO headquarters. In 2012, NATO Secretary General Anders Fogh Rasmussen visits Armenia and meets with Serzh Sargsyan. In 2014, Serzh Sargsyan participates in a NATO Member and Partner States meeting. In 2017, Serzh Sargsyan holds discussions with NATO Secretary General Jens Stoltenberg. In 2018, Prime Minister Nikol Pashinyan participates in a NATO summit in Brussels. In 2019, NATO's Special Representative for the Caucasus and Central Asia, James Appathurai paid a visit to Armenia and met with President Armen Sarkissian and other high ranking officials. On April 26 2022, Javier Colomina Píriz, the NATO Secretary General’s Special Representative for the Caucasus and Central Asia met with the Deputy Minister of Foreign Affairs of Armenia, Vahe Gevorgyan. Both sides discussed deepening cooperation between NATO and Armenia.

See also 
 Armenia and the United Nations
 Armenia–BSEC relations
 Armenia–European Union relations
 Armenia in the Council of Europe
 Armenia–OSCE relations
 Enlargement of NATO
 Foreign relations of Armenia
 Foreign relations of NATO
 Military of Armenia
 Partnership for Peace Information Management System

References

External links 
 Armenia-NATO partnership
 NATO Information Centre in Armenia

NATO relations
Enlargement of NATO
Foreign relations of Armenia
Politics of Armenia